Bill L. Shepherd Jr. (born November 18, 1949) is an American former basketball player.

A  guard born in Bedford, Indiana, Shepherd played at Carmel High School, where he was coached by his father, Bill Shepherd, Sr. He scored 2,465 points in four years and was selected as Indiana's Mr. Basketball in 1968. He then played at Butler University, also his father's alma mater, from 1969 to 1972, and set school records for highest career scoring average (24.1 points per game) and highest scoring average in a season (27.8 points per game).

From 1972 to 1975, Shepherd played in the American Basketball Association as a member of the Virginia Squires, San Diego Conquistadors, and Memphis Sounds. He averaged 5.7 points per game in his professional career, and led the ABA in three-point field goal percentage (.420) during the 1974–75 season. Afterward, he worked as a scout for Marty Blake. Shepherd was inducted into the Indiana Basketball Hall of Fame in 1997.

References

1949 births
Living people
American men's basketball players
Basketball players from Indiana
Butler Bulldogs men's basketball players
Memphis Sounds players
Parade High School All-Americans (boys' basketball)
People from Carmel, Indiana
Point guards
San Diego Conquistadors players
Virginia Squires players